Bishop McDevitt High School may refer to:

 Bishop McDevitt High School (Harrisburg, Pennsylvania), United States
 Bishop McDevitt High School (Wyncote, Pennsylvania), United States